Now or Never is the second studio album by American rapper Tela. It was released on October 6, 1998 through Rap-A-Lot Records. Recording sessions took place at House Of Blues in Memphis and at Hippie House in Houston. Production was handled by Tela himself, together with DJ Jus Borne, Jazze Pha, Neal Jones, BJB, SMK and Sam Sneed. It features guest appearances from the Hoodlumz, Big Zach, Do or Die, Jazze Pha, Scarface, Too $hort and Max Julien. The album peaked at number 49 on the Billboard 200 and number 13 on the Top R&B/Hip-Hop Albums.

Track listing

Personnel
Winston "Tela" Rogers – main artist, producer (tracks: 1-11, 15-18), mixing
Brad "Scarface" Jordan – featured artist (track 3)
Barry "O.C." Ware – featured artist (tracks: 3, 20)
Thomas "Low Key" McCollum – featured artist (tracks: 3, 20)
Todd "Too $hort" Shaw – featured artist (track 6)
Phalon "Jazze Pha" Alexander – featured artist (track 10), producer (tracks: 14, 15, 17)
Do Or Die – featured artists (track 17)
Max Julien – featured artist (track 18)
Big Zach – featured artist (track 19)
James "DJ Jus Borne" Blake – producer (tracks: 4, 7, 13)
Charles "BJ" Byrd – producer (track 12)
Samuel "Sam Sneed" Anderson – producer (track 12)
Neal Jones – producer (tracks: 17, 20), engineering, mixing
Sean "SMK" Pross – producer (track 19)
Kevin Haywood – engineering, mixing
Micah Harrison – engineering
Benny Quinn – mastering
James "J Prince" Smith – executive producer
Lisa Browne – artwork
Ray Blodget – artwork
Anzel "Red Boy" Jennings – artwork, production coordinator
Frederick Toma – photography
Cato Walker – production coordinator
Tony "Big Chief" Randle – supervisor

Charts

References

External links

 Tela - Now Or Never - Goldhiphop

1998 albums
Tela (rapper) albums
Rap-A-Lot Records albums
Albums produced by Jazze Pha
Albums produced by Sam Sneed